Marcos Suzano (born 1963) is a Brazilian percussionist, famous for playing with many Brazilian and international musicians, such as Gilberto Gil, Nando Reis and Titãs. He was born in Rio de Janeiro. Originally a rock fan, he experienced a carnaval bloco and became passionate about percussion thereafter. He quickly settled on the pandeiro as his primary instrument after witnessing the artistry of Jorginho do Pandeiro of the choro group Época de Ouro.

By the 1990s, Marcos Suzano had become perhaps the most recorded and widely hailed percussionist in Brazil. His technical innovations on pandeiro include an active left hand, which simultaneously holds and flips the instrument, with a very rapid right-hand technique that emphasizes bass strokes from the fingertips as well as the thumb. He has researched African rhythms and freely mixes modern funk riffs with traditional Brazilian folk patterns.

Discography

As a leader 
Olho de Peixe (with Lenine) (1993)
Sambatown (1996)
Flash (2000)
Satolep Sambatown (with Vitor Ramil) (2007)

As a featured artist 
Suite Três Rios - Dan Costa (Composer) (2016)

External links 
 
 More about Suzano on Pandeiro.com

References

1963 births
Living people
Brazilian percussionists
Musicians from Rio de Janeiro (city)
Brazilian session musicians